Ari'el Stachel (born July 29, 1991) is an American actor. He won the 2018 Tony Award for Featured Actor in a Musical for his role in The Band's Visit.

Early life
Stachel was born and raised in Berkeley, California. His father, Aaron  Yeshayahu, the son of Yemenite Jewish immigrants, was born and raised in Israel; his mother, Laura Stachel, is an Ashkenazi Jew from New York. The two met on a kibbutz. 

Stachel has said that while growing up, he was uncomfortable with his ethnic heritage. His parents divorced when he was young, and he chose to use his mother's last name in part to avoid being associated with his father's Middle Eastern background. He was in fifth grade when the 9/11 terror attacks occurred, and rather than be identified as part Arab, he told friends he was half Black. As a teenager, he avoided being seen in public with his father, and even excluded him from his high school graduation, as he "didn’t want to be seen with somebody who looked like an Arab." He finally embraced his heritage after being cast in The Band's Visit.

Stachel had his first role in a school musical at age 15, after which he left Berkeley High School to attend the Oakland School for the Arts. He went on to study drama at the NYU Tisch School of the Arts.

Career 
Following graduation, Stachel landed several stage roles and appeared on the CBS drama Blue Bloods and the Netflix series Jessica Jones before reading the script for The Band's Visit. He auditioned seven times over nine months before landing the role, for which he received Lortel Award and Drama Desk Award nominations before winning the Tony Award. In an emotional acceptance speech, Stachel thanked his parents and acknowledged his long struggle to accept his heritage. He stated, "I want any kid that's watching to know that your biggest obstacle may turn into your purpose." In 2019, Stachel began starring in the LGBTQ+ fantasy podcast The Two Princes as Prince Amir.

In 2020, Stachel became a recurring cast member on Law & Order: Special Victims Unit as Sergeant Hasim Khaldun.

Stachel appeared 2021 film Zola as Sean, the title character's fiancé.

In 2020, Stachel was set to appear in a starring role alongside David Hyde Pierce in The Public Theater's new musical adaptation of the 2007 film The Visitor. Stachel, who is of Yemeni and Ashkenazi Jewish descent, was cast to play the character of Tarek, an undocumented Syrian refugee. Stachel publicly discussed his frustration over his character’s accent. During an interview with Playbill, Stachel stated his intent to "speak English without any hint that [his character] was not raised in the United States," unlike in the original film. Due to COVID-19 pandemic lockdowns, the show’s Off-Broadway premiere was postponed. A few weeks into lockdowns, The Public Theater released a video of a musical number from the show that featured lead vocals from Stachel. By October 2021, the show was set to return to the stage for its official opening. However, a few days before previews were slated to begin, the show was delayed to address depictions of race and Arab-American representation. A few days later, it was announced that Stachel and The Public Theater's leadership had made a “mutual decision” that Stachel would depart the production. Stachel was replaced by his understudy, Ahmad Maksoud.

Personal life
Stachel is in a relationship with KiKi Layne, whom he met on the set of Don't Worry Darling in the fall of 2020.

Filmography

Film

Television

Awards and nominations

References

External links

American male musical theatre actors
American people of Israeli descent
American people of Yemeni-Jewish descent
Grammy Award winners
Tony Award winners
21st-century American male actors
Living people
1991 births
Tisch School of the Arts alumni
Daytime Emmy Award winners